Webster Melvin Slaughter (born October 19, 1964) is an American former professional football player who was a wide receiver in the National Football League (NFL) from 1986 to 1998.

Early life
Slaughter was born in Stockton, California, where he attended Franklin High School. He was raised alongside four siblings by his mother after his father died at the age of 13. She worked as a nurse to support the family. Slaughter excelled in the sports of basketball, baseball, and track alongside the band and speech teams at high school. However, at the request of football coach Duke Pasquini, he played on the football team for his senior year despite his doubts due to his small size of 140 pounds. It resulted in an All-Conference selection. Upon graduating in 1982, he attended San Joaquin Delta College (after considering Cal State Stanislaus) for football and part-time baseball for two years before transferring to San Diego State University with a scholarship, where he played for two years.  In two seasons, he caught a combined 122 passes for 1,647 yards and 14 touchdowns.

Pro football career
Cleveland Browns general manager Ernie Accorsi drafted Slaughter in the 2nd round (43rd overall) of the 1986 NFL Draft, based on the strong recommendation of the Browns' Hall of Fame receiver Paul Warfield, who was an unofficial scout for the team in 1986. During his rookie season he was listed at 6'0" and 175 lbs, and played in all sixteen games. In his first season, he caught 40 passes for 577 yards and four touchdowns. Slaughter played in both games of the postseason for the Browns. He caught six passes for 86 yards in the 23-20 win over the New York Jets in the Divisional Round. His 37-yard catch near the sideline late in the fourth quarter proved crucial when Mark Moseley's field goal was successful to force overtime in the eventual victory. In the AFC Championship against the Denver Broncos, he caught just one pass for 20 yards after suffering a dislocated shoulder in the first quarter as the Browns lost 23-20. In 1987, he played in twelve games and caught 47 passes for seven touchdowns. The Browns met the Broncos again the AFC Championship game. Slaughter caught just four passes for 53 yards, but one of them was a 4-yard catch for a touchdown that made the game tied at 31 in the fourth quarter. The Browns lost the game 38-33. 

He played just eight games in 1988, catching 30 passes for 462 yards and three touchdowns while dealing with a broken arm. However, he was ready for another postseason run. Facing the Houston Oilers in the Wild Card Round, Slaughter caught two touchdown passes to keep Cleveland in the game, narrowing deficits in the third quarter and fourth quarter despite catching a total of five passes for 58 yards. However, the Browns never recovered from losing the lead in the first quarter and lost 24-23. He had a breakout year in 1989, playing in all sixteen games and catching 65 passes for 1,236 yards and six touchdowns. He caught a pass from the 43 against the Chicago Bears when the Browns were at the 3-yard line in a 1989 game and ran all the way to the end zone to set a new record for longest Browns passing touchdown in team history that stood for a number of years. His receiving yards in a season was a Cleveland record until Braylon Edwards passed him in 2007. In the Divisional Round game for the playoffs, Slaughter and the Browns faced the Buffalo Bills. Slaughter caught a touchdown pass from 52 yards to give Cleveland a lead in the second quarter before catching another pass in the third for 44 yards and a ten-point lead. He caught a total of three passes for 114 yards and two touchdowns as Cleveland held on to win 34-30. In the AFC Championship Game against Denver, he caught just three passes for 36 yards in the 37-21 loss.

Slaughter caught 59 passes for 847 yards in 1990 for four touchdowns and played much of the same in his final year with Cleveland in 1991 with 64 catches for 906 yards and three scores. His highlight game in catches was in the December 22 game, when he caught eleven passes for 138 yards in a 17-10 loss to the Pittsburgh Steelers. It was the only time in his career that he caught more than nine passes in a game. As a member of the Browns, Slaughter caught a total of 305 passes and 27 touchdowns in six seasons, earning the praise of Accorsi who stated "(He was) one of the best receivers the Browns ever had." 

Slaughter left for the Houston Oilers (known for their Run and shoot offense) after the 1991 season ended due to a contract dispute that led to a lawsuit that went in favor of Slaughter and made him a free agent. The 1992 season saw Slaughter play in twelve games with nine as starter. He caught 39 passes for 486 yards for four touchdowns. The Oilers made the postseason and played the Buffalo Bills. He caught eight passes for 73 yards while scoring a touchdown that was the first of three touchdowns in the second quarter for Houston. They had a lead of 28-3 at halftime and were up by 32 in the third quarter, but Buffalo scored five straight touchdown passes from that point. When the score was 35–24, Slaughter tipped a ball off his hands that resulted in an interception by the Bills at the 23-yard line that saw them eventually score and narrow the game even further. The Bills stormed into the lead by three with 3:08 to go, but Slaughter caught an 18-yard pass on fourth down at the 34 to help set up a tying field goal. However, an interception in overtime set up Buffalo for the winning field goal that made the final score 41–38 in the largest comeback in NFL history. In 1993, he was targeted more and reaped the rewards for fourteen games, catching a career-high 77 passes for 904 yards for five touchdowns. He received his second and final Pro Bowl selection. Slaughter suffered an knee injury late in the season, which resulted in him being placed on injured reserve by the final game of the year that cost him a chance to play in the playoffs. 

He played in sixteen games with twelve starts in the 1994 season, his last in Houston. He caught 68 passes for 846 yards and two touchdowns. He moved over to the Kansas City Chiefs and started seven games in 1995. He caught 34 passes for 514 yards and four touchdowns. Slaughter made his final postseason appearance in the 1996 playoffs for Kansas City. In a 10-7 loss, he caught two passes for 10 yards.

He moved to the New York Jets for 1996, where he played sparingly after being inactive for six weeks in the middle of the year, which resulted in 32 catches for 434 yards and two touchdowns. Slaughter retired after the 1996 season but returned with the San Diego Chargers in 1998. He played in ten games before getting hurt and placed on injured reserve after catching just one pass in his final game on November 15 against Baltimore. He participated in the 1999 training camp of the Baltimore Ravens, but he did not make the cut and retired afterwards. Slaughter finished his career with 563 receptions for 8,111 yards and 44 touchdowns, along with nine carries for 50 yards.

After football
Slaughter currently serves as an ordained minister, where he goes to senior living facilities and reads the Bible to residents. He has four children.

In 2020, he was selected as a new member of the Cleveland Browns Legends program; the ceremony took place in the 2021 season.

References

External links
 Pro-Football-Reference.com – career statistics

1964 births
Living people
Players of American football from Stockton, California
American football wide receivers
San Joaquin Delta College alumni
San Diego State Aztecs football players
Cleveland Browns players
Houston Oilers players
Kansas City Chiefs players
New York Jets players
San Diego Chargers players
American Conference Pro Bowl players
Delta College Mustangs football players